The 2013 KHL Junior Draft was the fifth entry draft held by the Kontinental Hockey League (KHL), taking place on 25–26 May 2013 in Druzhba Arena. Ice hockey players from around the world aged between 17 and 21 years of age were selected. Players eligible to take part in the draft were required to not have an active contract with a KHL, MHL or VHL team.

Selections by round

Round 1

Round 2

Round 3

Round 4

Round 5

Selections per nation
The table shows the number of players selected by which country they played in prior to the draft:

See also
2013–14 KHL season
2013 NHL Entry Draft
KHL territorial pick

References

External links
 All 2013 Draft picks – khl.ru
 2013 Draft picks – eliteprospects

Kontinental Hockey League Junior Draft
Junior Draft